George Oldfield may refer to:
 George Oldfield (police officer) (1923–1985), British police detective
 George S. Oldfield, academic in the field of finance